Gmina Czarnocin may refer to either of the following rural administrative districts in Poland:
Gmina Czarnocin, Świętokrzyskie Voivodeship
Gmina Czarnocin, Łódź Voivodeship